Created in 1917, the Liberty L-4 was a four-cylinder water-cooled inline aircraft engine developed in the United States during World War I.  The Liberty L-4 was an experimental engine of , which was built by the Hudson Motor Car Company and primarily intended for use in training airplanes. Only two examples were produced, since other types of engines were available and already in production. While the engine was ground-tested, it is unknown if the L-4 was ever test-flown.
The L-4 was created as part of a US aircraft engine development effort which also created the six-cylinder Liberty L-6, eight-cylinder Liberty L-8 and twelve-cylinder Liberty L-12.

Specifications

See also

References

This article incorporates text from Liberty L-4, a public domain work of the United States Government.
 

1910s aircraft piston engines
Abandoned military aircraft engine projects of the United States
Hudson Motor Car Company